Rushmere St Andrew is a village, civil parish and electoral ward adjacent to part of the eastern edge of the borough of Ipswich in the East Suffolk district of Suffolk, England. The parish includes most of Rushmere Heath and parts of the Ipswich suburb of Broke Hall as well as the village of Rushmere St. Andrew, from which it draws its name. The parish was formed in 1894 from the rural part of the parish of Rushmere.

Rushmere Common 
Rushmere Common, also known locally as Rushmere Heath, is a large area of common land which dominates much of the south-east of the parish.  Home to the Rushmere Golf Club and bordered by Playford Road, Camberley Road, Tasmania Road, the Broke Hall Estate and Kesgrave, the common is an area enjoyed by walkers and cyclists alike, who take advantage of its wide open spaces and footpaths – including the Sandlings Walk, which starts on the common and ends in Southwold 60 miles away on the north Suffolk coast.

Sport 
The village is home to a number of sports clubs and associations and was for many years a base for a number of the sports and social clubs of local businesses, such as Willis Faber (now Ipswich School Sports Centre - Rushmere) and Crane Fluid Systems Sports and Social Club (now part of the Ipswich Town F.C. training and academy complex).  Ipswich Rugby Club and Ipswich YM Rugby Club are also in the parish, along with Ipswich Wanderers Football Club.

Politics

East Suffolk District Council
Since 1 April 2019 Rushmere St Andrew returns one councillor to East Suffolk District Council.

Suffolk Coastal District Council
Results following the ward change of 2003 to 2011. There were three seats during this period. The ward did not exist during the 2015 Suffolk Coastal District Council election. There were three seats during this period.

Woodbridge Urban District Council
As a result of the Local Government Act 1894 – which introduced Rural and Urban District Councils – Rushmere St Andrew was a ward of Woodbridge Urban District.

Notable residents
Robert Lacey Everett (1833-1916), farmer, Liberal politician, and Member of Parliament for Woodbridge

References

External links

Villages in Suffolk
Civil parishes in Suffolk
Ward in East Suffolk (district)